The 1985 Virginia Slims World Championship Series was the 15th season since the foundation of the Women's Tennis Association. It commenced in March 1985, and concluded in March 1986 after 52 events.

The Virginia Slims World Championship Series was the elite tour for professional women's tennis organised by the Women's Tennis Association (WTA). It was held in place of the WTA Tour from 1983 until 1987 and featured tournaments that had previously been part of the Toyota Series and the Avon Series. It included the four Grand Slam tournaments and a series of other events. ITF tournaments were not part of the tour, although they awarded points for the WTA World Ranking.

The season was dominated by Martina Navratilova, who won 13 tournaments and reached the finals of the four Grand Slam events. She defeated Chris Evert at Wimbledon and the Australian Open. Navratilova also won the Virginia Slims Championships in March and ended the year at World Number 1. Evert, the winner of ten titles in 1985, emerged victorious at Roland-Garros, while Hana Mandlíková won the U.S. Open. Newcomer of the Year Gabriela Sabatini won the first title of her career in Tokyo. In doubles, the pairing of Navratilova and Pam Shriver won the title at Roland-Garros and the Australian Open, Jordan and Smylie won the Wimbledon title and Kohde-Kilsch–Suková were victorious at the US Open.

Schedule
The table below shows the 1985 Virginia Slims World Championship Series schedule.

March

April

May

June

July

August

September

October

November

December

January 1986

February 1986

March 1986

Statistical information

Titles won by player
These tables present the number of singles (S), doubles (D), and mixed doubles (X) titles won by each player and each nation during the season, within all the tournament categories of the 1985 Virginia Slims World Championship Series: the Grand Slam tournaments, the Year-end championships and regular events. The players/nations are sorted by:

 total number of titles (a doubles title won by two players representing the same nation counts as only one win for the nation);
 highest amount of highest category tournaments (for example, having a single Grand Slam gives preference over any kind of combination without a Grand Slam title);
 a singles > doubles > mixed doubles hierarchy;
 alphabetical order (by family names for players).

Titles won by nation

Rankings

Singles

Awards
The winners of the 1985 WTA Awards were announced in 1986.

See also
 1985 Nabisco Grand Prix – men's circuit
 Women's Tennis Association
 International Tennis Federation

References

External links
Official WTA Tour website

 
Virginia Slims World Championship Series
1985 WTA Tour